Thérèse Raissa Neguel (born 30 December 1981) is a Cameroonian football referee.

Career 
She has been an international referee since 2007. She started at the Regional League North of Cameroon and Cameroon represented the women's tournament at the 2012 London Olympic Games. She was one of 16 referees selected for the FIFA Women's World Cup 2011.

She is part of female referees and assistant referees from 31 countries who were selected by FIFA to referee matches in the 2014 Algarve Cup in Portugal. This tournament is part of the preparation of candidates for the FIFA U-20 Women's World, Canada 2014 and the 2015 Women's World Cup FIFA, Canada.

References

External links 
 Profil de Thérèse Neguel sur weltfussball.de

Living people
1981 births
Cameroonian football referees
Women association football referees
FIFA Women's World Cup referees